Dragan Boltar (18 March 1913 – 16 February 1988) was a Croatian architect. His work was part of the architecture event in the art competition at the 1948 Summer Olympics.

References

1913 births
1988 deaths
20th-century Croatian architects
Olympic competitors in art competitions
Architects from Trieste